The 2017 Mississippi State Bulldogs football team represented Mississippi State University in the 2017 NCAA Division I FBS football season. The Bulldogs played their home games at Davis Wade Stadium in Starkville, Mississippi and competed in the Western Division of the Southeastern Conference (SEC). They were led by ninth-year head coach Dan Mullen. They finished the season 9–4, 4–4 in SEC play to finish in a tie for fourth  place in the Western Division. They were invited to the TaxSlayer Bowl where they beat Louisville.

Head coach Dan Mullen resigned at the end of the regular season to become the head coach at Florida. Running backs coach Greg Knox served as interim head coach for the TaxSlayer Bowl. On November 28, Penn State offensive coordinator Joe Moorhead was hired as their new head coach, beginning in the 2018 season.

Rankings

Schedule
Mississippi State announced its 2017 football schedule on September 13, 2016. The 2017 schedule consists of 7 home and 5 away games in the regular season. The Bulldogs will host SEC foes Alabama, Kentucky, LSU, and Ole Miss, and will travel to Arkansas, Auburn, Georgia, and Texas A&M.

The Bulldogs will host three of the four non-conference opponents, BYU, UMass both are football independent schools and Charleston Southern from the Big South Conference and travel to Louisiana Tech of Conference USA.

Schedule Source:

Game summaries

Charleston Southern

at Louisiana Tech

LSU

at Georgia

at Auburn

BYU

Kentucky

at Texas A&M

UMass

Alabama

at Arkansas

Ole Miss

vs Louisville–TaxSlayer Bowl

References

Mississippi State
Mississippi State Bulldogs football seasons
Gator Bowl champion seasons
Mississippi State Bulldogs football